Sporting Clube de Luanda best known as Sporting de Luanda, is an Angolan multisports club based in Luanda. The club's football team, while being one of the most ancient and traditional clubs in Luanda, has been out of major competition due to financial reasons.

The team was founded in 1920.

During the colonial period in Angola, the club has won eight times the Angolan Provincial Championship the top division of Angolan football as a Portuguese colony.

Following the country's independence in 1975 and in an attempt by the communist regime to erase all traces of colonial rule, the club which has been created as an affiliate to Sporting Clube de Portugal was ordered to change its name and therefore became known as Diabos Verdes (Green Devils), effective from January 31, 1980.

In February 1981, the club's name changed again as Leões de Luanda (Luanda's Lions).

On February 24, 1989, with the establishment of democracy, the club was able to reclaim its original name.

League & Cup Positions

Stadium
The team used to play at the 12000 capacity Estádio dos Coqueiros.

Honours
Angolan Provincial Championship: 1941, 1942, 1944, 1946, 1947, 1955, 1956, 1963

Manager history

Players

1991–2000

1979-1986

1973

See also 
 Girabola  (1986)

References

Football clubs in Angola
Sports clubs in Angola